Orai is a city in Uttar Pradesh, India, and the administrative headquarters of Jalaun District. All administrative offices of Jalaun District, including the District Collectorate, police, telecom and various other government organizations are located in this city. In 2019, Orai received the award of 'Fastest Mover' Small City among India (0.8–3.1 Lakh) under Swachh Survekshan, an annual cleanliness survey carried by the Quality Council of India.

History

Orai was named after Saint Uddalak, who worshiped in the city. Orai has historical value because of its location, which is between the cities of Jhansi, Mahoba, and Kalpi.

Alha and Udal of the Banaphar clan were legendary generals of the Chandela king Paramardi, who fought Prithviraj Chauhan in 1182 CE.

The town of Kalpi on the Yamuna was conquered by the armies of Muhammad of Ghor in 1196. Early in the 14th century, the Bundelas occupied the greater part of Jalaun, and even succeeded in holding the fortified post of Kalpi. During 1553–56, Hemu, the Hindu Prime Minister and Chief of Army of Sur Empire, won this area. Later, on 7 October 1556, he was crowned Emperor of northern India at Delhi. He established the Hindu Raj in northern India and acquired the title of Vikramaditya.

After Hemu Vikramaditya's death at the second battle of Panipat, this important possession was soon recovered by Akbar's army and incorporated into the Mughal Empire. Akbar's governors at Kalpi maintained a nominal authority over the surrounding district, and the Bundela chiefs were in a state of chronic revolt, which culminated in the war of independence under Maharaja Chhatrasal. During the outbreak of his rebellion in 1671, he occupied a large province to the south of the Yamuna. Setting out from this base, and assisted by the Marathas, he conquered the whole of Bundelkhand. Upon Chhatrasal's death in 1732, he bequeathed one-third of his dominions to his Maratha allies, who before long succeeded in annexing the whole of Bundelkhand.

Under Maratha rule, the country was prey to constant anarchy and strife. In 1806, Kalpi was turned over to the British, and on the death of Nana Gobind Ras in 1840, his possessions lapsed to them also. Various interchanges of territory took place, and in 1856 the boundaries of the British district were substantially settled, with an area of 1,477 square miles.

Orai was the scene of much violence during the Revolt of 1857. When the news of the rising at Kanpur reached Kalpi, the men of the 53rd Native Infantry deserted their officers, and in June the Jhansi rebels reached the Jalaun District and began their murder of Europeans. It was not until September 1858 that the rebels were finally defeated. In the later 19th century, the district suffered much from the invasive Kans grass (Saccharum spontaneum). Many villages were abandoned, their land no longer suitable for cultivation. In 1901, the population of the district was 399,726, and the two largest towns were Konch and Kalpi (pop. 10,139 in 1901). The district was traversed by the line of the Indian Midland Railway from Jhansi to Kanpur. A small part of the district is watered by the Bethwa Canal. Grain, oilseeds, cotton, and ghee were exported.

Orai participated in the freedom struggle under the leadership of Bundelkhand Kesri Dewan Shatrughan Singh and Rani Rajendra Kumari, the founders of the freedom movement in Bundelkhand. Their ancestral fort in Mangrauth is across the river Betwa from Jalaun District.

After 1990

After 1990, major changes came to Orai because of the development of the industrial area, presence of Hindustan Unilever, and the construction of new schools, colleges, and roads.

Climate

Orai has a composite climate, with high temperatures in summer and low in winter. Relative humidity remains about 40–50%. The climate of the district is characterized by a hot summer and general dryness, except for rainfall during the southwest monsoon season. The year has four seasons. The hot season is from March until the first week of June. The southwest monsoon runs from the middle of June until the end of September. October and middle of November constitute the post-monsoon or retreating monsoon season. The normal annual rainfall of Orai is 793.8 mm. About 90.4% of annual rainfall is received during monsoon season; only 9.6% of annual rainfall takes place between October to May. The humidity is lowest in April and varies between 26% and 83% throughout the year.

Demographics

The city of Orai is governed by the Municipal Corporation, which comes under Orai Metropolitan Region. The total area of Orai Is 20.86 km2.

The population of Orai in 2016 was 217,389, of which males and females comprised 111,987 and 105,402 respectively.

In 2011, there were 880 females for every 1,000 males. The ratio for children was 845 girls for every 1,000 boys. Children numbered 31,011 in Orai in 2016. There were 17,859 boys and 13,152 girls. Children form 7.01% of the total population of the city.

According to the 2011 Orai City Census data, the literacy rate was 82.35 percent.

Notable places

Ramkund Park is a recreational place with a paved walkway around a small water pond. Locals visit the park for their morning walk. It is located near Thadeshwari Maharaj Mandir (Sri Hanuman Mandir) and every year on "Budhwa Mangal", a large crowd from surrounding villages gathers for festivals of prayer for Lord Hanuman.

Shri Radha Krishna Mandir is a sacred temple located in Galla Mandi. Radhakrishna Temple is a branch of the JK Temple in Kanpur, Uttar Pradesh; the story of Krishna is visible on the wall of the temple.

Transport

Railway
Orai railway station is the main railway station, sitting between the Kanpur–Jhansi section and well-connected by rail with the eastern, western, and southern parts of India.

The existing railway line, within the North Central Railway division, runs from Jhansi to Kanpur. It has been electrified, and a doubling of the track is in progress. Orai's railway station is categorized as a "model railway station".

Many trains such as the Jhansi–Lucknow Intercity Express, Lucknow–Mumbai AC Express, Gwalior–Barauni Mail, Kushinagar Express, Sabarmati Express, and Pratham Swatantrata Sangram Express can be boarded in Orai.

Airports

Kanpur Airport, located in Chakeri near Kanpur, is the nearest airport. Flights to Delhi and Varanasi are operational from the airport. The nearest international airport is at Lucknow, which is about 200 kilometers away. The government has proposed setting up an international airport near Kanpur in the Kanpur dehat district, which would be in close proximity to the town. Gwalior Airport is 156 km from Orai by road.

Highway and roads system

An interstate bus terminus helps connect Orai with the rest of Uttar Pradesh and adjacent states. The East–West Corridor passes through Orai, connecting it to cities like Delhi, Gwalior, Gorakhpur, Kanpur, Jhansi, Lucknow, Kota, Udaipur, Kolkata, and Ahmedabad. Within the city, Tempo, e-rickshaw, and cycle rickshaw are the major forms of city transport.

Education
Government Medical College, Jalaun is a government medical college located in Orai.

Citations

External links
 
 Jalaun District website

Cities and towns in Jalaun district
Cities in Bundelkhand
Orai
Cities in Uttar Pradesh